Laurence "Laurie" Bell (born 1 September 1992) is an English professional footballer who plays as a midfielder for Caernarfon Town. Bell has also spent time with English sides Macclesfield Town and Hyde United.

Career

Early career
Bell joined Stockport County's School of Excellence at the age of eight, before moving to Manchester City's academy four years later. However, City let him go at the age of 16. After which he spent two years on a youth team apprenticeship at Rochdale, where he was part of a Football League Youth Alliance-title winning squad. However the club released him in May 2011.

Bell played college soccer at the University of Wisconsin–Milwaukee between 2011 and 2014. In 2013, he captained the Milwaukee Panthers to their victory in the Horizon League conference and qualification to the 2013 NCAA Division I Men's Soccer Championship, scoring 13 goals along the way, and being named as the Horizon League's player of the year and an NCAA First-Team All-American. While at college, Bell also appeared for USL PDL club Ventura County Fusion in 2014.

Bell was invited to the MLS 2015 Combine, but, hampered by a recurrence of patellar tendinitis which he had suffered during his teenage years, went undrafted in the 2015 MLS SuperDraft.

Professional
Bell signed with United Soccer League club Tulsa Roughnecks in March 2015. After one season with the Roughnecks, and a spell with semi-professional side Hyde United in his native England, Bell joined Swedish second division club Karlslunds IF HFK on a one-year contract in April 2016. He was named Player of the Year at Karlsunds IF HFK, after recording 11 goals and 10 assists in 24 matches and firing Karlslunds to 5th position in Division 2 - the club's highest finish for 7 years.

In December 2016, The Guardian published a blog by Bell about the challenges of pursuing a relatively low paying football career. In January 2017 Bell joined English Conference side Macclesfield Town before being sent out on loan to Hyde United. In March 2017, Bell re-joined Swedish side Karlslunds IF HFK. In January 2019, Bell left Karlslunds to join fellow Division 1 side BK Forward. After a year with Forward, Bell joined newly promoted Division 1 side Örebro Syrianska on a one-year deal.

References

External links 

 Milwaukee Panthers profile

1992 births
Living people
English footballers
Milwaukee Panthers men's soccer players
Ventura County Fusion players
FC Tulsa players
Hyde United F.C. players
Karlslunds IF players
Macclesfield Town F.C. players
BK Forward players
Caernarfon Town F.C. players
Association football midfielders
National League (English football) players
USL League Two players
USL Championship players
Ettan Fotboll players
Cymru Premier players
English expatriate sportspeople in the United States
English expatriate footballers
Expatriate soccer players in the United States
All-American men's college soccer players
Expatriate footballers in Sweden
English expatriate sportspeople in Sweden
People from Poynton